Brackenridge is a borough in Allegheny County, Pennsylvania, United States, located along the Allegheny River. It is part of the Greater Pittsburgh metropolitan area.

The town is named for Henry Marie Brackenridge. The borough once had glass factories. An Allegheny Technologies steel mill, Allegheny Ludlum Brackenridge Works, plays a prominent role in the community, although most of the facility is located in Harrison Township. 

The borough's population stood at 3,421 in 1910 and at 6,400 in 1940. As of the 2020 census, it was 3,240.

Geography

Surrounding and adjacent neighborhoods
Brackenridge has two land borders with Tarentum to the west and Harrison Township to the north and east.  Across the Allegheny River in Westmoreland County to the south, Brackenridge runs adjacent with Lower Burrell.

Demographics

As of the 2000 census, of 2000, there were 3,543 people, 1,507 households, and 931 families residing in the borough. The population density was 6,924.2 people per square mile (2,682.3/km2). There were 1,700 housing units at an average density of 3,322.4 per square mile (1,287.0/km2). The racial makeup of the borough was 95.03% White, 3.44% African American, 0.11% Native American, 0.23% Asian, 0.03% Pacific Islander, 0.37% from other races, and 0.79% from two or more races. Hispanic or Latino of any race were 0.54% of the population.

There were 1,507 households, out of which 24.6% had children under the age of 18 living with them, 43.9% were married couples living together, 13.6% had a female householder with no husband present, and 38.2% were non-families. 34.2% of all households were made up of individuals, and 17.3% had someone living alone who was 65 years of age or older. The average household size was 2.28 and the average family size was 2.91.

In the borough, the population was spread out, with 20.5% under the age of 18, 7.2% from 18 to 24, 28.1% from 25 to 44, 22.0% from 45 to 64, and 22.3% who were 65 years of age or older. The median age was 41 years. For every 100 females, there were 80.7 males. For every 100 females age 18 and over, there were 78.3 males.

The median income for a household in the borough was $30,050, and the median income for a family was $41,803. Males had a median income of $30,661 versus $21,821 for females. The per capita income for the borough was $19,040. About 6.8% of families and 9.4% of the population were below the poverty line, including 15.9% of those under age 18 and 9.9% of those age 65 or over.

Government and politics

Education
Brackenridge is within the Highlands School District, which operates Highlands Early Childhood Center, formerly Fairmount Primary School (grades K–2), on the hill section in the borough.

Notable people
 Bud Carson, professional football defensive coordinator, Cleveland Browns and Pittsburgh Steelers 
 Adam Earnheardt,  academic and author
 Cookie Gilchrist, African-American civil rights activist and former American Football League and Canadian Football League professional football player
 Ronald Robertson, Olympic silver medalist, figure skating

References

External links
Borough of Brackenridge official website

1901 establishments in Pennsylvania
Boroughs in Allegheny County, Pennsylvania
Pittsburgh metropolitan area
Populated places established in 1901